Caryl Phillips (born 13 March 1958) is a Kittitian-British novelist, playwright and essayist. Best known for his novels (for which he has won multiple awards), Phillips is often described as a Black Atlantic writer, since much of his fictional output is defined by its interest in, and searching exploration of, the experiences of peoples of the African diaspora in England, the Caribbean and the United States. As well as writing, Phillips has worked as an academic at numerous institutions including Amherst College, Barnard College, and Yale University, where he has held the position of Professor of English since 2005.

Life

Caryl Phillips was born in St. Kitts to Malcolm and Lillian Phillips on 13 March 1958. When he was four months old, his family moved to England and settled in Leeds, Yorkshire. In 1976, Phillips won a place at Queen's College, Oxford University, where he read English, graduating in 1979. While at Oxford, he directed numerous plays and spent his summers working as a stagehand at the Edinburgh Festival. On graduating, he moved to Edinburgh, where he lived for a year, on the dole, while writing his first play, Strange Fruit (1980), which was taken up and produced by the Crucible Theatre in Sheffield. Phillips subsequently moved to London, where he wrote two more plays Where There is Darkness (1982) and Shelter (1983) that were staged at the Lyric Hammersmith.

At the age of 22, he visited St. Kitts for the first time since his family had left the island in 1958. The journey provided the inspiration for his first novel, The Final Passage, which was published five years later. After publishing his second book, A State of Independence (1986), Phillips went on a one-month journey around Europe, which resulted in his 1987 collection of essays The European Tribe. During the late 1980s and early 1990s, Phillips divided his time between England and St. Kitts while working on his novels Higher Ground (1989) and Cambridge (1991).

In 1990, Phillips took up a Visiting Writer post at Amherst College in Amherst, Massachusetts. He remained at Amherst College for a further eight years, becoming the youngest English tenured Professor in the US when he was promoted to that position in 1995. During this time, he wrote what is perhaps his best-known novel, Crossing the River (1993), which won the Commonwealth Writers' Prize and the James Tait Black Memorial Prize, and was shortlisted for the Booker Prize. After taking up the position at Amherst, Phillips found himself doing "a sort of triangular thing" for a number of years, residing between England, St Kitts, and the U.S.

Finding this way of living both "incredibly exhausting" and "prohibitively expensive", Phillips ultimately decided to give up his residence in St. Kitts, though he says he still makes regular visits to the island. In 1998, he joined Barnard College, Columbia University, as the Henry R. Luce Professor of Migration and Social Order. In 2005 he moved to Yale University, where he currently works as Professor of English. He was made an elected fellow of the Royal Society of Literature in 2000, and an elected fellow of the Royal Society of Arts in 2011.

Works and critical reception 

Phillips has tackled themes on the African slave trade from many angles, and his writing is concerned with issues of "origins, belongings and exclusion", as noted by a reviewer of his 2015 novel The Lost Child. Phillips's work has been recognised by numerous awards, including the Martin Luther King Memorial Prize, a Guggenheim Fellowship, the 1993 James Tait Black Memorial Prize for Crossing the River and the 2004 Commonwealth Writers' Prize Best Book award for A Distant Shore.

Phillips received the PEN/Beyond Margins Award for Dancing in the Dark in 2006.

Activism 

Phillips is the patron of the David Oluwale Memorial Association, which works to promote the memory of the death of David Oluwale, a Nigerian man in Leeds who was persecuted to death by the police. On 25 April 2022 Phillips unveiled a Leeds Civic Trust blue plaque commemorating Oluwale's death, which was torn down hours later.

Bibliography

Novels
The Final Passage (Faber and Faber, 1985, ; Picador, 1995, paperback )
A State of Independence (Faber and Faber, 1986, ; paperback )
Higher Ground: A Novel in Three Parts (Viking, 1989)
Cambridge (Bloomsbury, 1991; Vintage, 2008, paperback )
Crossing the River (Bloomsbury, 1993)
The Nature of Blood (1997; Vintage, 2008, paperback )
A Distant Shore (Secker, 2003, hardback ; Vintage, 2004, paperback )
Dancing in the Dark (Secker, 2005)
Foreigners: Three English Lives (Harvill Secker, 2007)
In the Falling Snow (Harvill Secker, 2009, hardback ; Vintage, 2010, paperback )
The Lost Child (Oneworld Publications, 2015,  hardback, 978-1780747989 paperback)
A View of the Empire at Sunset: A Novel (Farrar, Straus and Giroux, 2018, hardback)

Essay collections
The European Tribe (Faber and Faber, 1987)
The Atlantic Sound (Faber and Faber, 2000)
A New World Order: Selected Essays (Martin Secker & Warburg, 2001)
Colour Me English (Harvill Secker, 2011, paperback )

As editor
 Extravagant Strangers: A Literature of Belonging (Faber and Faber, 1997)

Plays
 Strange Fruit (Amber Lane Press, 1980)
 The Shelter (Amber Lane Press, 1984)
 Playing Away (Faber and Faber, 1987)
A Kind of Home – James Baldwin in Paris (BBC Radio 4, 9 January 2004)
Hotel Cristobel (BBC Radio 3, 13 March 2005)
A Long Way from Home (BBC Radio 3, 30 March 2008)<ref>"A Long Way from Home", Drama on 3, BBC Radio 3.</ref>

 Awards 
 1987 Martin Luther King Memorial Prize, The European Tribe 1993 Guggenheim Fellowship
 1994 Lannan Literary Award
 1994 James Tait Black Memorial Prize, Crossing the River 2000 Fellow of the Royal Society of Literature
 2004 Commonwealth Writers Prize, Crossing the River 2006 Honorary Fellow of The Queen's College, Oxford
 2006 Commonwealth Writers Prize, A Distant Shore 2011 Fellow of the Royal Society of Arts
 2012 Best of the James Tait Black, shortlist, Crossing the River References 

 Notes 

 Sources 

Further reading
 Charras, Françoise, "De-Centering the Center: George Lamming’s Natives of My Person (1972) and Caryl Phillips's Cambridge (1991)", in Maria Diedrich, Carl Pedersen and Justine Tally (eds), Mapping African America: History, Narrative Form and the Production of Knowledge. Hamburg: LIT, 1999, pp.61–78. 
 Joannou, Maroula. "'Go West, Old Woman': The Radical Re-Visioning of Slave History in Caryl Phillips's Crossing the River", in Brycchan Carey and Peter J. Kitson (eds), Slavery and the Cultures of Abolition: Essays Marking the Bicentennial of the British Abolition Act of 1807. Cambridge: D.S. Brewer, 2007. 
 Ledent, Bénédicte. Caryl Phillips. Manchester: Manchester University Press, 2002.
 Muñoz-Valdivieso, Sofia, "'Amazing Grace': The Ghosts of Newton, Equiano and Barber in Caryl Phillips's Fiction", Afroeuropa 2, 1 (2008).
 O’Callaghan, Evelyn. "Historical Fiction and Fictional History: Caryl Phillips's Cambridge”, Journal of Commonwealth Literature'' 29.2 (1993): 34–47.

External links

Caryl Phillips' official website
The Caryl Phillips Bibliography
Caryl Phillips' Writers Page at the British Council
Phillips at Yale University
Caryl Phillips Papers. General Collection, Beinecke Rare Book and Manuscript Library, Yale University.
"'Lost Child' Author Caryl Phillips: 'I Needed To Know Where I Came From, NPR interview, 21 March 2015.

1958 births
20th-century British novelists
20th-century English male writers
20th-century essayists
21st-century English male writers
21st-century essayists
21st-century novelists
Alumni of The Queen's College, Oxford
Black British writers
British dramatists and playwrights
British male dramatists and playwrights
British male essayists
British male novelists
British non-fiction writers
British republicans
Fellows of the Royal Society of Literature
James Tait Black Memorial Prize recipients
Living people
PEN/Faulkner Award for Fiction winners
Saint Kitts and Nevis emigrants to the United Kingdom
Saint Kitts and Nevis literature
Saint Kitts and Nevis writers
Writers from Leeds